Magnar is a somewhat common forename for men in Norway. The name is known in Norway from the late 19th century. The name may be derived from the Norse word magn meaning "Strength" or possibly from the Latin name Magnus.

Notable people
Magnar Åm (born 1952), composer
Magnar Lund Bergo (born 1949), politician
Lars Magnar Enoksen (born 1960), Swedish writer and Glima wrestler
Magnar Estenstad (1924–2004), cross country skier
Magnar Fosseide (1913–1983), nordic combined skier
Magnar Freimuth (born 1973), Estonian nordic combined skier
Magnar Hellebust (1914–2008), politician
Tom Magnar Hetland (born 1954), journalist and editor
Magnar G. Huseby (1928–2011), engineer and politician
Magnar Ingebrigtsli (1932–2001), cross country skier and biathlete
Magnar Isaksen (1910–1979), football player
Bjarne Magnar Lerum (1941–2010), businessman and politician
Magnar Lundemo (1938–1987), cross country skier and runner
Magnar Lussand (born 1945), politician
Magnar Norderhaug (1939–2006), zoologist and ecologist
Magnar Ødegaard (born 1993), football player
Magnar Sætre (1940–2002), politician
Magnar Solberg (born 1937), biathlete
Magnar Sortåsløkken (born 1947), politician
Inge Magnar Valen (born 1951), football player

Norwegian masculine given names